Hyaline cartilage is the glass-like (hyaline) and translucent cartilage found on many joint surfaces. It is also most commonly found in the ribs, nose, larynx, and trachea. Hyaline cartilage is pearl-gray in color, with a firm consistency and has a considerable amount of collagen. It contains no nerves or blood vessels, and its structure is relatively simple.

Structure
Hyaline cartilage is covered externally by a fibrous membrane known as the perichondrium or, when it's along articulating surfaces, the synovial membrane. This membrane contains vessels that provide the cartilage with nutrition through diffusion.

Hyaline cartilage matrix is primarily made of type II collagen and chondroitin sulphate, both of which are also found in elastic cartilage.

Hyaline cartilage exists on the sternal ends of the ribs, in the larynx, trachea, and bronchi, and on the articulating surfaces of bones. It gives the structures a definite but pliable form. The presence of collagen fibres makes such structures and joints strong, but with limited mobility and flexibility.

Hyaline cartilage is the most prevalent type of cartilage. It also forms the temporary embryonic skeleton, which is gradually replaced by bone, and the skeleton of elasmobranch fish.

Microanatomy
When a slice of hyaline cartilage is examined under the microscope, it is shown to consist of cells (chondrocytes) of a rounded or bluntly angular form, lying in groups of two or more in a granular, or almost homogeneous matrix. When arranged in groups of two or more, the chondrocytes have rounded, but generally straight outlines; where they are in contact with each other, and in the rest of their circumference, they are rounded.

They consist of translucent protoplasm with fine interlacing filaments and minute granules are sometimes present. Embedded in this are one or two round nuclei, having the usual intranuclear network.

The cells are contained in cavities in the matrix, called cartilage lacunae. These cavities are actually artificial gaps formed from the shrinking of the cells during the staining and setting of the tissue for examination. The inter-territorial space between the isogenous cell groups contains relatively more collagen fibres, allowing it to maintain its shape while the actual cells shrink, creating the lacunae. This constitutes the so-called 'capsule' of the space. Each lacuna is usually occupied by a single cell, but during mitosis, it may contain two, four, or even eight cells.

Articular cartilage

Articular cartilage is hyaline cartilage on the articular surfaces of bones, and lies inside the joint cavity of synovial joints, bathed in synovial fluid produced by the synovial membrane, which lines the walls of the cavity.

Though it is often found in close contact with menisci and articular disks, articular cartilage is not considered a part of either of these structures, which are made entirely of fibrocartilage.

The articular cartilage extracellular matrix (ECM) has a highly specialized architecture that is zonally organized: the superficial zone consists mostly of collagen II fibers aligned parallel to the articular surface to resist shear forces, whereas the deep zone consists of the same fibers aligned perpendicularly to the bone interface to absorb compressive loads.

The biochemical breakdown of the articular cartilage results in osteoarthritis – the most common type of joint disease. Osteoarthritis affects over 30 million individuals in the United States alone, and is the leading cause of chronic disability amongst the elderly.

Additional images

See also
 Articular cartilage damage
 Articular cartilage injuries
 Articular cartilage repair
 Cartilage
 Hyaline

References

External links

 
 

Skeletal system
Connective tissue